Andy Ta, better known by his in-game name Smoothie, is a Canadian professional League of Legends player who was formally the support for League of Legends Championship Series team Counter Logic Gaming. He has also played for Team Dragon Knights, Team Liquid, Cloud9, Echo Fox and Team SoloMid.

Career 
Ta joined Team Liquid in October 2015, and the team announced the acquisition by posting a YouTube video with the team drinking smoothies. He later joined Cloud9 in June 2016, along with Johnny "Altec" Ru.

Tournament results 
 3rd — 2016 Spring NA LCS
 5th–6th — 2016 Spring NA LCS playoffs
 3rd — 2016 Summer NA LCS
 2nd  — 2016 Summer NA LCS playoffs
 1st  — 2016 NA LCS Regional Finals
 5th-8th 2016 League of Legends World Championship
 2nd — 2017 Spring NA LCS
 2nd  — 2017 Spring NA LCS playoffs
 4th — 2017 Summer NA LCS
 5th–6th  — 2017 Summer NA LCS playoffs
 1st  — 2017 NA LCS Regional Finals
 5th-8th 2017 League of Legends World Championship

References 

1997 births
Living people
Sportspeople from Edmonton
League of Legends support players
Cloud9 (esports) players
Counter Logic Gaming players
Team Dragon Knights players
Team Liquid players
Team Liquid Academy players
Place of birth missing (living people)
Canadian esports players